Sarah Anna Glover (13 November 1786 – 20 October 1867) was an English music educator who invented the Norwich sol-fa system.  Her Sol-fa system was based on the ancient gamut; but she omitted the constant recital of the alphabetical names of each note and the arbitrary syllable indicating key relationship, and also the recital of two or more such syllables when the same note was common to as many keys (e.g. C, Fa, Ut, meaning that C is the subdominant of G and the tonic of C). The notes were represented by the initials of the seven syllables, C, D, E, F, S, L, T; still in use today as their names.

Early life 
Glover was born in The Close, Norwich. She was baptized at St Mary in the Marsh on 18 November 1786. Glover received music lessons from the organist of Norwich Cathedral at the age of six. While teaching a Sunday school with her sister, she began creating her own simplified notation system now known as the Norwich Sol-Fa system. Not much of her career is known until her late twenties.

Career
Her father became Curate of St Laurence's Church, Norwich in 1811, which led to her taking over the music for the Church around that time. Her influence made the Church respected for its music and young women were sent to her for training. In 1812, Sarah started developing her educational methods that ended in two major publishings German Canons or Singing Exercises and Psalm Tunes Expressed in the Sol-Fa Notation of Music and Scheme for Rendering Psalmody Congregational. By 1827, she had developed a complete method musical notation, Norwich Sol-Fa, that she was using while teaching at an all girls school that she founded in Black Boy Yard, Norwich. In Sarah's notation system, the notes were represented by the initials of the seven tones of the diatonic scale. In doing this, she gave the name "ti" for the seventh scale degree that we still use today. She developed this learning system to aid teachers with a cappella singing. Her 1835 instructional book Scheme for Rendering Psalmody Congregational met with great success. It was later refined and developed by John Curwen, who did so without her permission. While there was ongoing, intellectual conversation between Glover and Curwen, there was always friction. The concept became well known in popular culture after it was featured in a song from The Sound of Music.

Sarah Glover also invented the harmonicon, which was an instrument designed to help her teach her music notation system. The harmonicon is a glockenspiel-like instrument spanning two chromatic octaves. Made of 25 glass keys, the instrument works by rotating a roller displaying the notes of the scale and the letters of the alphabet, which could be rotated to align with different musical keys.

Glover later lived in Cromer, then Reading, then Hereford. She died of a stroke in Great Malvern and was buried in Hereford.

See also
Psalmist movement
Jane Southcott (2019) biography of Glover https://rowman.com/isbn/9781793606044

References

External links
Glover biography, illustration, and monument via norwichchurches.co.uk

1785 births
1867 deaths
Educators from Norwich
19th-century English educators
British music educators
English women educators
Women music educators
19th-century women educators
19th-century English women